The Craft of Science Writing: Selections from The Open Notebook is a non-fiction book edited by Siri Carpenter and published in 2020 by The Open Notebook.

Synopsis 
The Craft of Science Writing presents more than 30 articles, some new, others previously published on The Open Notebook website, organized to answer five questions: "Who is a science journalist and how do you become one? What makes a science story and how do you find one? How do you report a science story? How do you tell your story? How do you build expertise in science writing?" 

In ALA's CHOICE, Melody Herr wrote that the articles are organized "into an introductory course that covers becoming a science journalist, identifying a story idea, conducting research, writing the story, and building proficiency in core skills". She also said the articles demonstrate effective idea presentation, "through personal anecdotes, interviews with award-winning journalists, expert panel discussions, and visuals, including a marked-up science article, a flowchart, and helpful checklists".

Jonathan Wai wrote in Psychology Today, that it "...seeks to illuminate the craft of science writing by collecting numerous perspectives from science writers themselves about how to improve their own craft of science writing." Carolyn Crist wrote the pieces "offer advice about how to pitch stories, evaluate scientific and statistical claims, report on controversial topics, and engage readers with a scientific story."

Critical reception 
Wai wrote, "The conversation among scientists themselves has not yet included learning from science writers and editors themselves, and thus this new volume, in my view, is important to read for scientists to understand what it is that science writers do, what it means to tell a great story about science, and the incentive structure that science writers are under especially as journalism is rapidly shifting." 

The editor of Brontide Journal said,"It is the go to source for anyone who wants to write about science. Whether that's the science behind the story or if the science, is the story itself."

Herr wrote that the articles "address artistic, practical, and business aspects of the craft", as well as "the emotional strain of reporting and the journalist’s social responsibility to confront flawed science and incorporate diverse voices... Summing Up: Highly recommended. All readers".

Jacqui Banaszynski said that this anthology and The Open Notebook, "while embedded in a science-based world, offer valuable wisdom for any writer who covers a challenging specialty subject. Or, frankly, for any writer who has the aspiration to do high-level, in-depth work."

See also 

 Environmental journalism
 Medical journalism
 Nature writing
 Non-profit journalism
 Popular science writing

 Science journalism

References

External links

 The Science Behind Writing About Science (audio, 10:28 minutes)

2020 non-fiction books
American non-fiction books
Science writing